Dayalpur Sapha is a village in Hajipur, Vaishali, in the state of Bihar. It has existed since around 1500 AD.

Demographics

The population is approximately 9,865 (98% Hindu and 2% Muslim). The literacy rate is 53.03% with a female rate of 38.94% and a male rate of 66.51%.

Climate
The region is green with plants and trees growing in a semi-tropical monsoon climate. The months of May–June are hot and December–January are cold.

Direction board

References

External links
 Brand Bihar
 All About Bihar
 Wikimapia
 
 

Villages in Vaishali district